Franz Boehm (October 3, 1880 in Boleszyn – February 13, 1945 in Dachau concentration camp) was a Roman Catholic priest of the Archdiocese of Cologne, resistance fighter and martyr.

Life 
Franz Boehm came from a German-Polish family of teachers. He spent his primary school years in the Rhineland. He was graduated from a secondary school in Mönchengladbach. After his philosophical and theological studies in Bonn, he was ordained a priest for the Archdiocese of Cologne in 1906. At his three chaplain positions in the Ruhr area, he was also active in the Polish pastoral care, as he speaks the Polish language. He also baptized in his mother tongue and not in Latin, as originally intended. He took up his first pastor's post in 1917 in St. Katharina in Düsseldorf. In 1923 he became a pastor in Sieglar.

Resistance to National Socialism 
Supported by the mayor of Sieglar, the Gestapo repeatedly investigated Boehm and imposed numerous sanctions. In 1934 there were criminal proceedings, which were discontinued; In 1935, Boehm was banned from teaching religious education. At the same time he received his first expulsion from the administrative district of Cologne, which was lifted again in 1936 by an amnesty. The second and final expulsion followed in 1937. Boehm had to leave Sieglar and wait for the General Vicariate to assign him a new job. However, the archbishop's policy of protecting its own clergy did not make it possible for Boehm to receive a new pastorate directly. In letters, Boehm took the view that he had acted in Sieglar according to the motto “stand fast in one spirit, with one soul striving for the faith of the gospel; and in nothing affrighted by the adversaries” (Phil. 1:27 f.). Therefore, in a letter dated October 12, 1937, he asked the General Vicariate to "take pity on the physical and mental pressure" and to "assign him to a new place of work as soon as possible".

In 1938 Boehm then took up a position as a parish priest in Monheim am Rhein. In his priestly work he continued to resist the Nazi regime. Boehm worked primarily with young people. He always countered the increasing escalation with the Bible verse: "they are all mute dogs, they cannot bark" (Is 56:10). The 450-page Gestapo files show that he received a fine in 1938 and a warning in 1941 for worshiping in Polish. In 1942 he was sentenced to a security payment of 3,000 RM for a sermon on Christ the King. At Easter 1944 he preached against the Nazi film industry, which led to his first arrest. On June 5, 1944, immediately after a mass in the church, he was arrested again. In connection with the arrests around July 20, 1944, Boehm was taken to the pastor's block in the Dachau concentration camp on August 11, 1944. Even a letter from the bishop could not change anything about the imprisonment. He died in the concentration camp on February 13, 1945, as a result of an illness caused by his imprisonment. The parish priest's body was cremated after his violent death. The ashes were either dumped in a nearby river or scattered on a field.

Effect to the present 
Franz Boehm is considered one of the bravest pastors of the Archdiocese of Cologne during the National Socialist era. In Monheim am Rhein, on "Franz-Boehm-Strasse" in front of the staircase to St. Gereon, a stumbling block commemorates Boehm - also in front of the rectory of St. Catherine in Düsseldorf. In Düsseldorf, the Catholic elementary school on Kamper Weg was renamed the "Franz-Boehm-Schule" in 2002. In Monheim and Sieglar, streets and parish centers are named after Franz Boehm. In 2020 a memorial place was inaugurated in Monheim in honor of the unforgotten parish priest.

In 1999, the Catholic Church included parish priest Franz Boehm as a witness of faith in the German Martyrology of the 20th Century. In the traveling exhibition "Martyrs of the Archdiocese of Cologne from the National Socialist Era", which has been showing the educational work of the Archdiocese of Cologne at various locations since 2006, Franz Boehm has a prominent position. In 2010, Catholics from the parish in Monheim submitted a petition to the Archdiocese of Cologne to initiate a beatification process for their popular saint. As a contemporary witness, the historian of philosophy Karl Bormann reported in the process of beatification that what he valued most about Boehm was that he was "helpful, deeply religious, conscientious, strict and uncompromising".

Bibliography 
 Bedšrich Hoffmann: And Who Will Kill You: The Chronicle of the Life and Sufferings of Priests in the Concentration Camps. 4. Edition, Pallottinum, Poznan 1994, ISBN 978-83-7014-223-0, p. 395.
 Helmut Moll:  "Wenn wir heute nicht unser Leben einsetzen ...". Martyrer des Erbistums Köln aus der Zeit des Nationalsozialismus, Cologne 1998, ISBN 978-3931739-09-6, p. 22-23.
 Helmut Moll: Zeugen für Christus. Das deutsche Martyrologium des 20. Jahrhunderts, Paderborn u. a. 1999, 7th revised and updated edition 2019, ISBN 978-3-506-78012-6, Volume I, p. 342–345.

Weblinks 
 Priest-Franz-Boehm-Parish-Center, Monheim am Rhein
 Franz Boehm Memorial (Municipality of Monheim)

References 

1880 births
1945 deaths
20th-century German people
20th-century venerated Christians
Roman Catholic activists
German people who died in Dachau concentration camp
German people who died in Nazi concentration camps
People condemned by Nazi courts
People killed by Nazi Germany
Resistance members killed by Nazi Germany
Resistance members who died in Nazi concentration camps
Roman Catholics in the German Resistance
Venerated Catholics